Nick Wechsler is an American film producer.

Biography
Before focusing exclusively on film production, Nick Wechsler started his career as an entertainment attorney, then transitioned into music management. His clients included Steve Earle, John Lydon aka Johnny Rotten, Michael Penn, Chris Whitley, and The Band guitarist Robbie Robertson.

Wechsler's film producing career involves a mix of independent and studio movies, such as 1989 Palme d'Or winner Sex, Lies, and Videotape, 1991 Golden Globe winner The Player, 2006 Oscar-nominated North Country, and 2007 Cannes Main Competition Selection We Own the Night. Wechsler was the founder and co-chairman of the management and production company Industry Entertainment.

In 2005, Wechsler established Nick Wechsler Productions, an independent film production company.

He produced Steven Soderbergh's Magic Mike (2012), starring Channing Tatum and Matthew McConaughey, The Host, starring Saoirse Ronan, and two films penned by Pulitzer Prize winner Cormac McCarthy; 2009's The Road directed by John Hillcoat, and The Counselor (2013), directed by Academy Award winner Ridley Scott, starring Brad Pitt, Michael Fassbender and Cameron Diaz.  He also produced Jonathan Glazer's highly acclaimed third feature Under the Skin, starring Scarlett Johansson, which premiered at the Toronto International Film Festival in 2013.  A non-fiction book entitled Alien in the Mirror: Scarlett Johansson, Jonathan Glazer and Under the Skin by author Maureen Foster is a scene-by-scene and behind-the-scenes analysis of Under the Skin, and includes quotes from Wechsler on the financing and development of the film.  Following the success of Magic Mike, which grossed $170 million worldwide, Wechsler re-teamed with Channing Tatum, Reid Carolin, Steven Soderbergh and Gregory Jacobs to produce the sequel to Magic Mike in fall 2014.

Personal life
In December 2001, he married model/actress Stephanie Romanov in Cambodia; they have one child together, Lily Andreja Romanov-Wechsler.

Filmography
He was a producer in all films unless otherwise noted.

Film

As writer

Thanks

Television

References

External links

American film producers
Living people
1949 births